Mount Seymour is a rural locality in the local government area of Southern Midlands in the Central region of Tasmania. The 2016 census determined a population of 75 for the state suburb of Mount Seymour.

History
Mount Seymour was gazetted as a locality in 1974.

Geography
Mount Seymour (the mountain) is in the north of the locality.

Road infrastructure
The C312 route (Tunnack Road) enters from the west and runs through to the south-east, where it exits. Route C315 (Black Gate Road) starts at an intersection with C312 and runs west until it exits.

References

Localities of Southern Midlands Council
Towns in Tasmania